Sagittaria demersa, commonly called Chihuahuan arrowhead, is an aquatic plant species native to north-central Mexico (Chihuahua, Durango. Hidalgo, Aguascalientes, Jalisco and Querétaro) and also from a few sites in the northern part of the US State of New Mexico (Mora and Colfax Counties).

Sagittaria demersa is an annual herb up to 60 cm tall. Leaves are flat, very long and narrow, up to 55 cm long but rarely more than 7 mm across. The plant occurs mostly submerged in streams and lakes.

References

demersa
Flora of Chihuahua (state)
Flora of Durango
Flora of Hidalgo (state)
Flora of Mexico
Flora of Aguascalientes
Flora of Jalisco
Flora of Querétaro
Flora of New Mexico
Freshwater plants
Plants described in 1894